Kennedy Award(s) or Kennedy Prize may refer to:

Harrison H. Kennedy Award, an American high school football award in West Virginia
Kennedy Awards (journalism), Australian journalism awards
Kennedy Prize (art), an Australian art prize, see List of Australian art awards

See also
Brian Kennedy Award, a UK award for contribution to gay and lesbian communities
Byron Kennedy Award, an Australian award for technical achievement in film and TV, part of AACTA Awards
Edward M. Kennedy Prize for Drama, of which the inaugural prize was won by Robert Schenkkan
Graham Kennedy Award for Most Outstanding Newcomer, an Australian award, one of the Logie television awards
Jimmy Kennedy Award, one of the Ivor Novello Awards for musical composition
 John F. Kennedy Award, awarded at the Holyoke Saint Patrick's Day Parade in Holyoke, Massachusetts, U.S.
Ken Kennedy Award, an American computing award established in 2009
Robert F. Kennedy Award for Excellence in Public Service, awarded at the Harvard Kennedy School to a graduating student each year
Robert F. Kennedy Journalism Award, an American award for journalism established in 1968
Robert F. Kennedy Human Rights Award, an American human rights award created in 1984
Serena McDonald Kennedy Fiction Award, an American literary award
Thomas Kennedy Award, a award named after Thomas Kennedy (1776–1832)